Presidential, legislative and local elections were held on November 14, 1961 in the Philippines. Incumbent President Carlos P. Garcia lost his opportunity for a second full term as President of the Philippines to Vice President President Diosdado Macapagal. His running mate, Senator Sergio Osmeña, Jr. lost to Senator Emmanuel Pelaez. Six candidates ran for president, four of whom were "nuisance" candidates. This was the only election in Philippine electoral history in which a vice-president defeated the incumbent president.

Results

President

Vice-President

Senate

House of Representatives

See also
Commission on Elections
Politics of the Philippines
Philippine elections
President of the Philippines
5th Congress of the Philippines

References

External links
 The Philippine Presidency Project
 Official website of the Commission on Elections

1961
General election